Kurt Koch (2 November 1919 – 9 November 2000) was a German football manager.

He trained the Regionalliga clubs VfB Oldenburg from 1960 to 1965 and Altona 93 in the 1966–67 season. In the seasons 1967–68 and 1968–69 he coached Bundesliga club Hamburger SV, where his greatest success was reaching the 1968 UEFA Cup Winners' Cup Final. In 1971–72 he coached FC Schweinfurt 05.

References

1919 births
2000 deaths
German football managers
Bundesliga managers
VfB Oldenburg managers
Altonaer FC von 1893 managers
Hamburger SV managers
SV Arminia Hannover managers
West German football managers